The 1994–95 Club Necaxa season is the 12th consecutive season in the top flight division of Mexican football.

Summary
In summertime President Enrique Borja appointed Manuel Lapuente as new head coach and reinforced the squad with the transfers in of defenders Eduardo Vilches, Octavio Becerril and Jose Maria Higareda. Also, the arrival of Forward Luis Hernandez He is widely regarded as one of Mexico's most talented strikers. from CF Monterrey was crutial for the success in the upcoming season. Lapuente was known as manager thanks to clinching two league trophies with Puebla FC (1983 and 1990).

The team made a decent league tournament finished on 4th spot classifying to the post-season and defeating incumbent Champion Tecos UAG in a two leg series. Then in semifinals, the squad defeated regular season leader and heavy-favourites to the title CD Guadalajara after two matches. The club advanced to the final against Cruz Azul winning the trophy league with a global score of 3-1.

Also, in Copa Mexico the squad clinched the title after winning the final 2-0 against Veracruz reaching The Double for the first time ever.

Squad

Transfers

Winter

Competitions

La Liga

League table

Group 1

General table

Results by round

Matches

Quarterfinals

Copa Mexico

First round

Semifinals

Final

Statistics

Players statistics

References

External links

1994–95 Mexican Primera División season
1994–95 in Mexican football
Club Necaxa seasons